Michael J. Sullivan (born December 18, 1956) was the mayor of the City of Lawrence, Massachusetts. A Republican, Sullivan became the mayor in 2001 after beating Isabel Melendez. He was re-elected in 2005 beating Marcos Devers in non-partisan elections.

Although he formed an exploratory committee to enter the Special Election to replace Congressman Marty Meehan, Sullivan ultimately decided not to run and endorsed Republican candidate Jim Ogonowski.

He is the brother of former Lawrence Mayor and State Cabinet Secretary Kevin J. Sullivan.

References

External links
Mayor Sullivan's official website

1956 births
Living people
Massachusetts city council members
Massachusetts Republicans
Mayors of Lawrence, Massachusetts